Del Frisco's Double Eagle Steak House is a fine dining restaurant steakhouse chain founded in 1981 that was operated by Del Frisco's Restaurant Group until the restaurant was acquired by Landry's, Inc. in September 2019, with 71 locations across the United States.

See also
 List of restaurants in New York City
 List of steakhouses

References

External links

Landry's Inc.
Steakhouses in the United States
Restaurants established in 1981
Restaurant chains in the United States